The following are the association football events of the year 1998 throughout the world.

Events
1998 FIFA World Cup – France wins 3–0 over Brazil in Saint-Denis, France, winning their first cup. More than one million delirious fans jammed the Champs-Élysées, dancing through the night.
UEFA Champions League: Real Madrid won 1–0 in the final against Juventus. This was Real Madrid's seventh European Cup title.
Copa Libertadores 1998: Won by Vasco da Gama after defeating Barcelona SC on an aggregate score of 4–1.
UEFA Cup Winners' Cup: Chelsea beat VfB Stuttgart 1–0 in the final, winning the Cup for the second time.
UEFA Cup: Inter Milan won 3–0 in the final against Lazio. This was Inter's third UEFA Cup title.
UEFA Super Cup: Chelsea beat Real Madrid 1–0, winning the cup for the first time.
England:
FA Premier League Champions: Arsenal.
February 17 – Manchester City fires manager Frank Clark and appoints Joe Royle as his successor.
May 16 – Arsenal beats Newcastle United 2–0 to win the FA Cup, achieving The Double.
August 16 – PSV wins the Johan Cruyff Shield, the annual opening of the new season in the Eredivisie, by a 2–0 win over Ajax in the Amsterdam Arena.
September 17 – Heerenveen makes a winning European debut after defeating Poland's Amica Wronki (3–1) in the first round of the UEFA Cup Winners' Cup.
October 8 – Manager Artur Jorge resigns at Dutch club Vitesse and is succeeded by Herbert Neumann.
October 10 – Frank Rijkaard makes his debut as the manager of the Netherlands national team, as the successor of Guus Hiddink, with a 2–0 friendly win over Peru in Eindhoven. One player makes his debut as well: striker Jeffrey Talan from Heerenveen.
December 1 – Real Madrid wins the Intercontinental Cup in Tokyo by defeating Brazil's Vasco da Gama: 2–1. The winning goal for the Spaniards is scored by Raúl in the 83rd minute.
December 7 – Dutch club Sparta Rotterdam fires manager Hans van der Zee. He is replaced by Jan Everse on December 24.

Winner national club championships

Asia
  – Esteghlal FC
  – Kashima Antlers
  – Al-Ittihad
  - Suwon Bluewings
  - Sinthana F.C.

Europe
 Croatia – Croatia Zagreb
  – Arsenal
  – Lens
  – 1. FC Kaiserslautern
  – Újpest
  – Juventus
 
 Eredivisie – Ajax
 Eerste Divisie – AZ
  – ŁKS Łódź
  – Porto
  – Celtic
  – Barcelona
  – AIK
  – Galatasaray
 FR Yugoslavia – Obilić

North America
 – St. Catharines Wolves (CPSL)

Verano – Toluca
Invierno – Necaxa
 – Chicago Fire (MLS)

South America

Clausura – Vélez Sársfield
Apertura – Boca Juniors
  – Blooming
  – Corinthians
  – Colo-Colo
  – LDU Quito
  – Olimpia Asunción
  – Universitario de Deportes

International tournaments
 African Cup of Nations in Burkina Faso (February 7 – 28 1998)
 
 
 
 Baltic Cup (April 21 – June 25, 1998)
 
 
 
 FIFA World Cup in France (June 10 – July 12, 1998)

National team results

Europe



South America

The men's national senior squad didn't play any matches in 1998





Births

 January 2 – Timothy Fosu-Mensah, Dutch footballer
 January 3 – Patrick Cutrone, Italian footballer
 January 5 – Carles Aleñá, Spanish footballer
 January 8 – Manuel Locatelli, Italian footballer
 January 11 – Salih Özcan, German midfielder 
 January 16 – Odsonne Édouard, French footballer
 January 21 – Borna Sosa, Croatian youth international
 February 3 – Blás Riveros, Paraguayan footballer 
 February 10 – Aitor Buñuel, Spanish footballer
 February 17 – Todd Cantwell, English footballer
 March 10 – Matías Zaracho, Argentinian footballer
 March 28 – Sandi Lovric, Austrian footballer
 March 31
Lucian Oprea, Romanian soccer player
Hristiyan Iliev, Bulgarian soccer player
 May 7 – Dani Olmo, Spanish footballer
 May 8 – Johannes Eggestein, German footballer
 May 11 – Fran Villalba, Spanish footballer
 May 23
Ross Cunningham, Scottish footballer
Luca De La Torre, American footballer
Berat Özdemir, Turkish footballer
 June 1 – Branimir Kalaica, Croatian footballer
 June 22 – Javairô Dilrosun, Dutch footballer
 June 28 – Óscar Rodríguez Arnaiz, Spanish footballer
 June 30 
 Tom Davies, English footballer
 Houssem Aouar, French footballer
 July 8 – Yann Karamoh, French footballer
 September 1 – Emily Condon, Australian footballer
 September 19 – Jacob Bruun Larsen, Danish footballer
 October 27 – Dayot Upamecano, French footballer
 November 12 – Jules Koundé, French footballer
 November 24 – Muhammad Rafli, Indonesian footballer
 December 17 – Martin Ødegaard, Norwegian footballer
 December 18 – Calvin Stengs, Dutch footballer
 December 29 – Victor Osimhen, Nigerian footballer

Deaths

May
 May 2 – Justin Fashanu (38), English footballer and the first professional footballer to come out as gay

June
 June 4 – Miguel Montuori (65), Argentinian-Chilean footballer
 June 13 – Fernand Sastre (74), French footballer

July
 July 13 – Pierre Garonnaire (82), French footballer

August
 August 6 – Henk Bosveld (57), Dutch footballer

September
 September 2 – Jackie Blanchflower (65), Northern Irish footballer
 September 23 – Héctor Vilches, Uruguayan defender, winner of the 1950 World Cup. (88)

References

 
Association football by year